Iconix Co, Ltd. is an entertainment studio based in Seoul, and is a major South Korean entertainment company formed by the merger of Iconix. The company is commonly referred to as simply "Iconix", the same name used in previous incarnations of Iconix.

Iconix also licenses anime for Korean releases and produces animated TV shows; these range from a South Korean dub of Toei Animation's Ojamajo Doremi, and Korean series Michel. Iconix is jointly owned by the animation companies Toei Animation, SK Broadband, Ocon Animation Studio, Roi Visual, and DR Movie.

History
Iconix Entertainment was found in September 25, 2001.

Properties
Animated titles from Iconix include Pororo the Little Penguin, Tai Chi Chasers, Tayo the Little Bus, Restol, The Special Rescue Squad, Ricky & Ralph, among others. It also handles distribution licensing for the following:

Pororo to the Cookie Castle 
Dinga
Chiro and Friends
Woobiboy
Hello, Woobiboy 
Bistro Recipe
Ojamajo Doremi (dubbed)
Mo~tto! Ojamajo Doremi
Ojamajo Doremi Dokkān
Tumoya Island
Spheres
Tayo the Little Bus
Titipo Titipo (spinoff)
Tai Chi Chasers
Nalong, Fly To The Sky
Flowering Heart
Cedric
Wild Instrict
Hero & Amy
Turtle Hero
Tayo's Big Trip
Lupo Alberto
Bruno Bozzetto's The Spaghetti Family
Curucuru and Friends
Petit Petit Muse

See also
Sunwoo Entertainment
Educational Broadcasting System

References

External links
Official website (in Korean)
English website
Studio Kaab homepage - Iconix associate

South Korean animation studios
Mass media in Seoul
Mass media companies established in 1996